Turks in Switzerland, also referred to as Swiss Turks and Turkish Swiss people, are Swiss residents of Turkish origin. The majority of Swiss Turks descend from the Republic of Turkey; however there has also been Turkish migration waves from other post-Ottoman countries including ethnic Turkish communities which have come to Switzerland from the Balkans (e.g. from Bulgaria, Greece, Kosovo, North Macedonia and Romania), the island of Cyprus, and more recently Iraq and Syria.

Culture

Religion

The majority of the Turkish community in Switzerland adhere to Islam. However, their religious organisations differ from those of other Muslim communities in the country. The Turks are divided by ideological and political divisions of their home country. When in the 1970s the Islamic movement Millî Görüş was established in Germany for the German Turkish community, some of the Turks in Switzerland joined this organisation. But the activities of the Diyanet İşleri Türk İslam Birliği, the Turkish directorate of religious affairs that sends Imams to the Turkish diaspora, attracted other Turks to adhere to this state-controlled form of Islam. Turkish groups such as the Sufi Suleymancilar and the Nurcu confraternity also play a role in the Turkish Muslim community in Switzerland. These are exact Gulen Movement people, different from the current Turkey's Government, after the 15 July Turkey's coup d'état attempt purges.

Discrimination
On 17 March 2021 supporters of the PKK group attacked the home of Şeref Yıldız, the head of the Swiss Turkish Society (ITT), for the fifth time in two years, forcing him to move to another residence to protect his children. 

By 29 April 2021, a bomb ready to explode was found in the mailbox of the headquarters of the Swiss Turkish Society (ITT), which serves as the umbrella group of Turkish nongovernmental organizations (NGOs) in the Rumlang region. Police evacuated the entrance and exit of the town. It was suspected that the PKK group were behind the attack because, for several months, there had been attacks by PKK supporters against the headquarters and institutions belonging to the Turkish community in Switzerland.

Notable people

See also 

List of Turkish Swiss people
Relations of Switzerland and Turkey
Turks in Europe
Turks in Austria
Turks in Germany
Turks in France
Turks in Liechtenstein
Turks in Italy

References

Bibliography 
 
.
.

External links
Bilateral relations between Switzerland and Turkey

Switzerland
Switzerland
Ethnic groups in Switzerland
Muslim communities in Europe
 

tr:Avrupa'da yaşayan Türk vatandaşları#İsviçre